Zentner is a surname. Notable people with the surname include:

Alexi Zentner (born 1973), Canadian novelist
Ellen Zentner, American economist 
Eric Zentner (1981-2011), American fashion model
Jorge Zentner (born 1953), Argentine comic writer
Nick Zentner (born 1962), Professor of Geology at Central Washington University 
Robin Zentner (born 1994), German footballer
Si Zentner (1917-2000), American trombonist